In mathematics, a module is a generalization of the notion of vector space in which the field of scalars is replaced by a ring. The concept of module generalizes also the notion of abelian group, since the abelian groups are exactly the modules over the ring of integers.

Like a vector space, a module is an additive abelian group, and scalar multiplication is distributive over the operation of addition between elements of the ring or module and is compatible with the ring multiplication.

Modules are very closely related to the representation theory of groups. They are also one of the central notions of commutative algebra and homological algebra, and are used widely in algebraic geometry and algebraic topology.

Introduction and definition

Motivation 
In a vector space, the set of scalars is a field and acts on the vectors by scalar multiplication, subject to certain axioms such as the distributive law.  In a module, the scalars need only be a ring, so the module concept represents a significant generalization.  In commutative algebra, both ideals and quotient rings are modules, so that many arguments about ideals or quotient rings can be combined into a single argument about modules.  In non-commutative algebra, the distinction between left ideals, ideals, and modules becomes more pronounced, though some ring-theoretic conditions can be expressed either about left ideals or left modules.

Much of the theory of modules consists of extending as many of the desirable properties of vector spaces as possible to the realm of modules over a "well-behaved" ring, such as a principal ideal domain. However, modules can be quite a bit more complicated than vector spaces; for instance, not all modules have a basis, and even those that do, free modules, need not have a unique rank if the underlying ring does not satisfy the invariant basis number condition, unlike vector spaces, which always have a (possibly infinite) basis whose cardinality is then unique. (These last two assertions require the axiom of choice in general, but not in the case of finite-dimensional spaces, or certain well-behaved infinite-dimensional spaces such as Lp spaces.)

Formal definition 
Suppose that R is a ring, and 1 is its multiplicative identity.
A left R-module M consists of an abelian group  and an operation  such that for all r, s in R and x, y in M, we have

The operation · is called scalar multiplication.  Often the symbol · is omitted, but in this article we use it and reserve juxtaposition for multiplication in R. One may write RM to emphasize that M is a left R-module.  A right R-module MR is defined similarly in terms of an operation .

Authors who do not require rings to be unital omit condition 4 in the definition above; they would call the structures defined above "unital left R-modules". In this article, consistent with the glossary of ring theory, all rings and modules are assumed to be unital.

An (R,S)-bimodule is an abelian group together with both a left scalar multiplication · by elements of R and a right scalar multiplication ∗ by elements of S, making it simultaneously a left R-module and a right S-module, satisfying the additional condition  for all r in R, x in M, and s in S.

If R is commutative, then left R-modules are the same as right R-modules and are simply called R-modules.

Examples 

If K is a field, then K-vector spaces (vector spaces over K) and K-modules are identical.
If K is a field, and K[x] a univariate polynomial ring, then a K[x]-module M is a K-module with an additional action of x on M that commutes with the action of K on M. In other words, a K[x]-module is a K-vector space M combined with a linear map from M to M. Applying the structure theorem for finitely generated modules over a principal ideal domain to this example shows the existence of the rational and Jordan canonical forms.
The concept of a Z-module agrees with the notion of an abelian group. That is, every abelian group is a module over the ring of integers Z in a unique way. Such a module need not have a basis—groups containing torsion elements do not. (For example, in the group of integers modulo 3, one cannot find even one element which satisfies the definition of a linearly independent set since when an integer such as 3 or 6 multiplies an element, the result is 0. However, if a finite field is considered as a module over the same finite field taken as a ring, it is a vector space and does have a basis.)
The decimal fractions (including negative ones) form a module over the integers. Only singletons are linearly independent sets, but there is no singleton that can serve as a basis, so the module has no basis and no rank.
If R is any ring and n a natural number, then the cartesian product Rn is both a left and right R-module over R if we use the component-wise operations. Hence when , R is an R-module, where the scalar multiplication is just ring multiplication. The case  yields the trivial R-module {0} consisting only of its identity element. Modules of this type are called free and if R has invariant basis number (e.g. any commutative ring or field) the number n is then the rank of the free module.
If Mn(R) is the ring of  matrices over a ring R, M is an Mn(R)-module, and ei is the  matrix with 1 in the -entry (and zeros elsewhere), then eiM is an R-module, since . So M breaks up as the direct sum of R-modules, . Conversely, given an R-module M0, then M0⊕n is an Mn(R)-module. In fact, the category of R-modules and the category of Mn(R)-modules are equivalent. The special case is that the module M is just R as a module over itself, then Rn is an Mn(R)-module.
The right R-module case is analogous. In particular, if R is commutative then the collection of R-module homomorphisms  (see below) is an R-module (and in fact a submodule of NM).
If X is a smooth manifold, then the smooth functions from X to the real numbers form a ring C∞(X). The set of all smooth vector fields defined on X form a module over C∞(X), and so do the tensor fields and the differential forms on X.  More generally, the sections of any vector bundle form a projective module over C∞(X), and by Swan's theorem, every projective module is isomorphic to the module of sections of some bundle; the category of C∞(X)-modules and the category of vector bundles over X are equivalent.
If R is any ring and I is any left ideal in R, then I is a left R-module, and analogously right ideals in R are right R-modules.
If R is a ring, we can define the opposite ring Rop which has the same underlying set and the same addition operation, but the opposite multiplication:  if  in R, then  in Rop.  Any left R-module M can then be seen to be a right module over Rop, and any right module over R can be considered a left module over Rop.
 Modules over a Lie algebra are (associative algebra) modules over its universal enveloping algebra.
If R and S are rings with a ring homomorphism , then every S-module M is an R-module by defining . In particular, S itself is such an R-module.

Submodules and homomorphisms 

If X is any subset of an R-module M, then the submodule spanned by X is defined to be  where N runs over the submodules of M which contain X, or explicitly , which is important in the definition of tensor products. 

The set of submodules of a given module M, together with the two binary operations + and ∩, forms a lattice which satisfies the modular law:
Given submodules U, N1, N2 of M such that , then the following two submodules are equal: .

If M and N are left R-modules, then a map  is a homomorphism of R-modules if for any m, n in M and r, s in R,
.
This, like any homomorphism of mathematical objects, is just a mapping which preserves the structure of the objects.  Another name for a homomorphism of R-modules is an R-linear map.

A bijective module homomorphism  is called a module isomorphism, and the two modules M and N are called isomorphic. Two isomorphic modules are identical for all practical purposes, differing solely in the notation for their elements.

The kernel of a module homomorphism  is the submodule of M consisting of all elements that are sent to zero by f, and the image of f is the submodule of N consisting of values f(m) for all elements m of M. The isomorphism theorems familiar from groups and vector spaces are also valid for R-modules.

Given a ring R, the set of all left R-modules together with their module homomorphisms forms an abelian category, denoted by R-Mod (see category of modules).

Types of modules 

 Finitely generated An R-module M is finitely generated if there exist finitely many elements x1, ..., xn in M such that every element of M is a linear combination of those elements with coefficients from the ring R.
 Cyclic A module is called a cyclic module if it is generated by one element.
 Free A free R-module is a module that has a basis, or equivalently, one that is isomorphic to a direct sum of copies of the ring R. These are the modules that behave very much like vector spaces.
 Projective Projective modules are direct summands of free modules and share many of their desirable properties.
 Injective Injective modules are defined dually to projective modules.
 Flat A module is called flat if taking the tensor product of it with any exact sequence of R-modules preserves exactness.
 Torsionless A module is called torsionless if it embeds into its algebraic dual.
 Simple A simple module S is a module that is not {0} and whose only submodules are {0} and S.  Simple modules are sometimes called irreducible.
 Semisimple A semisimple module is a direct sum (finite or not) of simple modules.  Historically these modules are also called completely reducible.
 Indecomposable An indecomposable module is a non-zero module that cannot be written as a direct sum of two non-zero submodules. Every simple module is indecomposable, but there are indecomposable modules which are not simple (e.g. uniform modules).
 Faithful A faithful module M is one where the action of each  in R on M is nontrivial (i.e.  for some x in M).  Equivalently, the annihilator of M is the zero ideal.
 Noetherian A Noetherian module is a module which satisfies the ascending chain condition on submodules, that is, every increasing chain of submodules becomes stationary after finitely many steps.  Equivalently, every submodule is finitely generated.
 Artinian An Artinian module is a module which satisfies the descending chain condition on submodules, that is, every decreasing chain of submodules becomes stationary after finitely many steps.
 Graded A graded module is a module with a decomposition as a direct sum  over a graded ring  such that  for all x and y.
 Uniform A uniform module is a module in which all pairs of nonzero submodules have nonzero intersection.

Further notions

Relation to representation theory 

A representation of a group G over a field k is a module over the group ring k[G].

If M is a left R-module, then the action of an element r in R is defined to be the map  that sends each x to rx (or xr in the case of a right module), and is necessarily a group endomorphism of the abelian group .  The set of all group endomorphisms of M is denoted EndZ(M) and forms a ring under addition and composition, and sending a ring element r of R to its action actually defines a ring homomorphism from R to EndZ(M).

Such a ring homomorphism  is called a representation of R over the abelian group M; an alternative and equivalent way of defining left R-modules is to say that a left R-module is an abelian group M together with a representation of R over it. Such a representation  may also be called a ring action of R on M.

A representation is called faithful if and only if the map  is injective. In terms of modules, this means that if r is an element of R such that  for all x in M, then . Every abelian group is a faithful module over the integers or over some ring of integers modulo n, Z/nZ.

Generalizations 
A ring R corresponds to a preadditive category R with a single object. With this understanding, a left R-module is just a covariant additive functor from R to the category Ab of abelian groups, and right R-modules are contravariant additive functors. This suggests that, if C is any preadditive category, a covariant additive functor from C to Ab should be considered a generalized left module over C. These functors form a functor category C-Mod which is the natural generalization of the module category R-Mod.

Modules over commutative rings can be generalized in a different direction: take a ringed space (X, OX) and consider the sheaves of OX-modules (see sheaf of modules). These form a category OX-Mod, and play an important role in modern algebraic geometry. If X has only a single point, then this is a module category in the old sense over the commutative ring OX(X).

One can also consider modules over a semiring. Modules over rings are abelian groups, but modules over semirings are only commutative monoids. Most applications of modules are still possible. In particular, for any semiring S, the matrices over S form a semiring over which the tuples of elements from S are a module (in this generalized sense only). This allows a further generalization of the concept of vector space incorporating the semirings from theoretical computer science.

Over near-rings, one can consider near-ring modules, a nonabelian generalization of modules.

See also 
 Group ring
 Algebra (ring theory)
 Module (model theory)
 Module spectrum
 Annihilator

Notes

References 
 F.W. Anderson and K.R. Fuller: Rings and Categories of Modules, Graduate Texts in Mathematics, Vol. 13, 2nd Ed., Springer-Verlag, New York, 1992, 
 Nathan Jacobson. Structure of rings. Colloquium publications, Vol. 37, 2nd Ed., AMS Bookstore, 1964,

External links 
 
 

Algebraic structures
 Module